Allem Alby (English : Teach my heart) (Arabic : علم قلبي ), is a studio album by Amr Diab, and was released on 4 February 2003. It contains 13 tracks, including the hit of the album Ana Ayesh.

Sales
Allem Alby album sales reached +750,000 copies, although it did not reach the number of sales of the previous album Aktar Wahed, but it left a great imprint in Arabic music in terms of the great development in musical arrangements and melodies.  It contains a variety of musical genres, including hip-hop, R&B, pop and rock.

Criticism 
Amr Diab was criticized by the press because of the long hair with curly tufts, and the color of red hair on the cover of the Allem Alby album, but despite that it was a good way to promote the album.

Music video

Ana Ayesh which was Track number 2 was chosen to be the music video for the album. It was directed by Stuart Gosling. It was aired with the release of the Alam El Phan new Channel Mazzika .

Track listing

Credits adapted from CD booklet.

Personnel 
Personnel as listed in the album's liner notes.
Amr Diab – all vocals
Yasser Anwar, Mohamed Sakr – engineer, mixing
Fady Temsah, Ahmed Gouda, Khaled Raouf, Yasser Hussein – engineer
Fahd – Music Producer
Hani Yaqoub – Music Producer
Amr Shaker – Music Producer
Mohsen Gaber – Producer

References

External Reviews
Album Review on AllMusic

2003 albums
Amr Diab albums